The James A. Sledge House, at 749 Cobb St. in Athens, Georgia, was built around 1860.  It was listed on the National Register of Historic Places in 1974.

It is a one-and-a-half-story Gothic Revival cottage. Its most salient features are its steep roof and three tall triangular front-facing dormers. It has a one-story veranda across the front of the house.

It is also included in the Cobbham Historic District.

References

National Register of Historic Places in Clarke County, Georgia
Gothic Revival architecture in Georgia (U.S. state)
Houses completed in 1860